The Queen of Spades, is a 1910 Russian short film directed by Pyotr Chardynin.

Plot 
The film is based on the 1834 short story "The Queen of Spades" by Alexander Pushkin.

Starring 
 Pavel Biryukov as Germann (as P. Biryukov)
 Aleksandra Goncharova as Liza
 Antonina Pozharskaya as Countess (as A. Pozharskaya)
 Andrey Gromov as Tomskiy

References

External links 
 

1910 films
1910s Russian-language films
Russian silent short films
1910 short films
Russian black-and-white films
Films of the Russian Empire
Films based on The Queen of Spades